Suan Station is a station of Busan Metro Line 4 in Suan-dong, Dongnae District, Busan, South Korea.

Station Layout

Vicinity
 Exit 1: Kanada Dental Clinic
 Exit 2: Korean BBQ
 Exit 3: Kanada Dental Clinic
 Exit 4: Shinhan Bank Dongrae Central Branch
 Exit 5:
 Exit 6: National Pension Service Dongnae Geumjeong Governor
 Exit 7: Forbidden City Cafe, Jangchung-dong Royal Foot Bossam Busan Direct Store
 Exit 8: Greenjoy Dongnae

External links
  Cyber station information from Busan Transportation Corporation

Busan Metro stations
Dongnae District
Railway stations opened in 2011
2011 establishments in South Korea